Stephannie Blanco Salazar (born 13 December 2000) is a Costa Rican professional footballer who plays as a defender for Spanish Primera División club Sporting de Huelva and the Costa Rica women's national team.

Club career
In January 2020 Stephannie joined Liga Deportiva Alajuelense.

International goals
Scores and results list Costa Rica's goal tally first

Personal life
Blanco is a Bribri from Talamanca.

References

External links

2000 births
Living people
People from Limón Province
Costa Rican women's footballers
Women's association football defenders
Deportivo de La Coruña (women) players
Sporting de Huelva players
Primera División (women) players
Costa Rica women's international footballers
Footballers at the 2019 Pan American Games
Medalists at the 2019 Pan American Games
Pan American Games medalists in football
Pan American Games bronze medalists for Costa Rica
Costa Rican expatriate footballers
Costa Rican expatriate sportspeople in Spain
Expatriate women's footballers in Spain
Indigenous peoples in Costa Rica
21st-century Costa Rican women